Events in the year 1955 in Norway.

Incumbents
 Monarch – Haakon VII
 Regent – Olav after July, following injury to King due to fall
 Prime Minister – Oscar Torp (Labour Party) until 22 January, Einar Gerhardsen (Labour Party)

Events

 14 January – Prime Minister Oscar Torp resigned.
 22 January – Gerhardsen's Third Cabinet was appointed.
 3 December – Osvald Harjo returned to Norway after 13 years in Soviet prison camps.
 Municipal and county elections are held throughout the country.

Popular culture

Sports
Kristian Kristiansen, novelist, playwright, short story and children's writer, is awarded the Mads Wiel Nygaard's Endowment literary prize

Music

Film

Literature
Jonas, novel by Jens Bjørneboe

Notable births

2 March – Sven Mollekleiv, organizational leader
10 April – Marit Breivik, handball player and coach.
16 June – Grete Faremo, former politician and businessperson
18 July – Hilde Grythe, actress.
30 July – Gunnar Pettersen, handball player and coach.
5 August – Lise Christoffersen, politician
7 August – Vigdis Hjulstad Belbo, politician
10 August – Kari Henriksen, politician
16 August – Åse Lill Kimestad, politician
30 November – Berit Kjøll, corporate officer and sports administrator.
16 December – Kari Økland, politician

Full date missing
Gerd Kvale, psychologist

Notable deaths

16 January – Asbjørn Halvorsen, international soccer player and general secretary of the Norwegian Football Association (born 1898)
25 January – Hans Peter Elisa Lødrup, journalist, newspaper editor, non-fiction writer and politician (born 1885).
16 February – Einar Osland, politician (born 1886)
2 May – Torkell Vinje, politician (born 1879)
1 June – F. Melius Christiansen, violinist and choral conductor (born 1871)
2 June – Haaken Hasberg Gran, botanist (born 1870)
28 June – Haakon Lind, boxer (born 1906)
6 July – Alfred Næss, speed skater (born 1877)
10 July – Einar Frogner, politician and Minister (born 1893)
11 July – Christian S. Oftedal, politician (born 1907)
22 July – Haakon Shetelig, archaeologist (born 1877)
30 July – Ferdinand Schjelderup, mountaineer, Supreme Court Justice and resistance member (born 1886)
4 September – Christen Gran Bøgh, jurist, tourism promoter and theatre critic (born 1876)
9 September – Einar Liberg, rifle shooter and Olympic gold medallist (born 1873).
17 October – Charles Mackenzie Bruff, forensic chemist (born 1887).

Full date unknown
Anders Fjelstad, politician (born 1879)
Karl Hovelsen, Nordic skier (born 1877)
Andreas Tostrup Urbye, politician and Minister (born 1869)

See also

References

External links